
Gmina Czarna Białostocka is an urban-rural gmina (administrative district) in Białystok County, Podlaskie Voivodeship, in north-eastern Poland.

The gmina contains part of the protected area called Knyszyń Forest Landscape Park.

Villages
Apart from the town of Czarna Białostocka, Gmina Czarna Białostocka contains the villages and settlements of Brzozówka Koronna, Brzozówka Strzelecka, Brzozówka Ziemiańska, Budzisk, Burczak, Chmielnik, Czarna Wieś Kościelna, Czumażówka, Dworzysk, Horodnianka, Hutki, Jesienicha, Jezierzysk, Karczmisko, Klimki, Kosmaty Borek, Krzyżyki, Lacka Buda, Łapczyn, Łazarz, Machnacz, Niemczyn, Ogóły, Oleszkowo, Osierodek, Ośrodek, Podbrzozówka, Podratowiec, Podzamczysk, Ponure, Przewalanka, Ratowiec, Rogoziński Most, Ruda Rzeczka, Rudnia, Wilcza Jama, Wólka Ratowiecka, Zamczysk, Zdroje, Złota Wieś and Złotoria.

Neighbouring gminas
Gmina Czarna Białostocka is bordered by the gminas of Dobrzyniewo Duże, Janów, Jasionówka, Knyszyn, Korycin, Sokółka, Supraśl and Wasilków.

References
Polish official population figures 2006

Czarna Bialostocka
Białystok County